Snow Ghosts is a British musical group active since 2008. As of 2020, they have released four studio albums and four EPs.

History
Producer Ross Tones (aka Throwing Snow) and vocalist Hannah Cartwright (aka Augustus Ghost) first met and started collaborating in 2008, having a shared interest in British folklore and experimental electronic music.

The first Snow Ghosts record, the Lost at Sea EP, was released through Black Acre Records in 2011. Following this initial release, Tones and Cartwright spent the next two years compiling their debut album, A Small Murmuration, which was released on London nightclub Fabric's record label Houndstooth in 2013.

In 2014, Tones and Cartwright joined forces with multi-instrumentalist Oliver Knowles, (aka The Keep), and Snow Ghosts became a trio. The band's second album, A Wrecking, was released on Houndstooth in February 2015.

In March 2015, Snow Ghosts embarked on a UK and Ireland tour with Portico, which saw them play in cities including London, Bristol, Manchester, and Dublin.

Commercial use of music
 August 2013 - "And the World Was Gone" - episode 10 ("The Overlooked"), season 3 of Teen Wolf
 July 2015 - "Held the Light" - Channel 4 trailer for Witnesses
 December 2015 - "The Hunted" - first official trailer for X-Men: Apocalypse
 February 2016 - "Lost at Sea" - Channel 4 trailer for Thicker Than Water
 March 2016 - "Circles Out of Salt" - season 2, How to Get Away with Murder

Discography
Studio albums
 A Small Murmuration (2013)
 A Wrecking (2015)
 Husk (2016)
 A Quiet Ritual (2019)

EPs
 Lost at Sea (2011)
 And the World Was Gone (2013)
 Secret Garden (2013)
 Real World Sessions (2020)

Singles
 Murder Cries (2013)
 The Fleet (2015)
 The Hunted (2015)
 Lied (2016)
 Vetiver (2016)

References

External links
 

2008 establishments in the United Kingdom
British folk music groups
Musical groups established in 2008